The women's 63 kg competition at the 2022 European Judo Championships was held on 30 April at the Armeets Arena.

Results

Finals

Repechage

Pool A

Pool B

Pool C

Pool D

References

External links
 

W63
European Judo Championships Women's Half Middleweight
European W63